Staroye Kryukovo is a district of Moscow within Zelenogradsky Administrative Okrug.

See also
Administrative divisions of Moscow

References

Notes

External links

 
Districts of Moscow
Zelenograd